Edward Tickell (9 February 1861 – 4 January 1942) was a British sports shooter. He competed in the men's 50 metre pistol event at the 1912 Summer Olympics.

References

1861 births
1942 deaths
British male sport shooters
Olympic shooters of Great Britain
Shooters at the 1912 Summer Olympics
Sportspeople from Cheltenham